Carex houghtoniana, also known as Houghton's sedge, is a species of flowering plant in the sedge family, Cyperaceae. It is native to eastern Canada and the northeastern United States.

See also
 List of Carex species

References

houghtoniana
Plants described in 1836
Flora of North America